Szymany is a village in the administrative district of Gmina Kozłowo, within Nidzica County, Warmian-Masurian Voivodeship, in northern Poland. It is located in the historic region of Masuria.

The village has a population of 70.

References

Szymany